Zhora "Gevorg" Saghateli Harutyunyan (September 7, 1928 in Yerevan – January 10, 2002 in Yerevan) was an Armenian writer, playwright and theater director, awarded by the Renowned activist of arts of Armenia official title, the State Prize of Armenia, "Gabriel Sundukian" and "Artavazd" Prizes. Vardan Ajemian was his first supporter as a theater activist. Harutyunyan is an author of many comedies and plays, which were staged in Armenia and abroad. He headed the Playwright's Union of Armenia. Since 1965 he directed the Armenian branch of the USSR Literary Fund. A member of Writers Union of Armenia committee.

In 1946, he graduated from Yerevan Medical College. In 1962 he finished the Yerevan Medical Institute. In 1950-1965 he worked at different medical institutions of Yerevan. In 1964 was appointed Chief Doctor at USSR Literary Fund Armenian Branch Polyclinics. In 1965 he was appointed USSR Literary Fund Armenian Branch Director and left the medical area forever. He was on this position up to 1965. Zhora Harutyunyan was also Writers Union of Armenia committee member. Vardan Ajemian was his first supporter as a theater activist. Harutyunyan is an author of many comedies and plays, which were staged in Armenia and abroad. Zhora Harutyunyan's works were translated into different languages. Zhora Harutyunyan's filmography:

1955 - Golden Bull Calf 1964 - Lipstick #4 1969 - Panos the Clumsy 1972 – Monument 1975 - A Bride from the North 1980 - The Big Win 1983 - The Fire 1987 - A Drugstore on the Crossroads

Zhora Harutyunyan is the author of many famous plays: “Patient #199”, “In the world of flowers”, “Heart Disease”, “Ghazar goes to War”, “Fortunate People”, “Crossroad”, “Your Final Destination”, “It was Sunny June”, “In Our Age” and many others. His plays have been stages in different countries of former USSR and Europe, such as South Caucasus, Central Asia, Russia, Hungary and Bulgaria. In autumn of 2008 on the occasion of his 80th anniversary of birth Zhora Harutyunyan's last play “Mr. Shmo and Friends” (the scenic title was “Who are they?”) was staged by the People's Artist Yervand Ghazanchyan at the Musical Comedy Theater after H. Paronyan.

A number of researches are devoted to Zhora Harutyunyan's life and activities. One of them is “The Knight of the Humor” (Yerevan, 1999); written by NAS RA Academician Sevak Arzumanyan, as well as outstanding playwright Zhirayr Ananyan's analytical work “Gevorg Harutyunyan” (Yerevan, 1981) and Candidate of Literary Criticism Vachagan Grigoryan's “Dramaturgy of Gevorg Harutyunyan” (Yerevan, 2006).
In 2003, on the occasion of Zhora Harutyunyan's 75th anniversary of birth the compilation of Zhora Harutyunyan's previously unreleased works was published by his daughter Gayane Harutyunyan.

In 2005, Gayane Harutyunyan initiated the publication of another commemorative anthology “You came, surprised Us All and Leaved Us”. Here the reader can find the memoirs of his famous contemporaries about him, who represent the world of art and literature.

Filmography
Khachmeruki deghatune (1988) (At the Crossroad Drugstore)
Hrdeh (1984) (The Fire)
Khoshor shahum (1981) (The Big Win)
Harsnatsun hyusisits (1975) (TV) (A Bride from the North)
Dzakhord Panose (1969) (TV) (Panos the Clumsy)
Voske tslik (1955) (Golden Bull Calf),
Shrtnerk #4 (Leap-stick #4 ),
Hushardzan (1972) (The Monument),
Ghazare gnum e paterazm (Ghazar Goes to War) and others.

References

 Zhora Harutyunyan on menqhayenq.am
 The Time to Love the Human Being
 Biography

External links
 

1928 births
2002 deaths
Writers from Yerevan
Yerevan State Medical University alumni
Recipients of the Order of the Red Banner of Labour
Armenian dramatists and playwrights
Armenian male writers
Armenian screenwriters
Armenian theatre directors
Soviet dramatists and playwrights
Soviet male writers
Soviet screenwriters
Soviet theatre directors